Jet Pilot may refer to:

 Jet pilot
 Jet Pilot (horse), an American Thoroughbred racehorse
 Jet Pilot (film), a 1957 Cold War action film
 Jet Pilot (Roy Lichtenstein), a 1962 pop art work
 "Jet Pilot", a song by Bob Dylan from the album Biograph
 "Jet Pilot", a song by System of a Down from the album Toxicity